Redneck Deer Huntin' is a hunting simulation video game developed by Xatrix Entertainment and published by Interplay Entertainment for MS-DOS and Microsoft Windows in 1998. It is a spinoff of the 1997 first-person shooter Redneck Rampage. It was later re-released for Steam (both Windows and macOS) in 2017.

Gameplay
The player controls Leonard, the protagonist of the Redneck Rampage series. Using one of five weapons (.44 Magnum revolver, .30-06 hunting rifle, .30-06 hunting rifle with scope, 12-gauge pump-action shotgun, and crossbow) and a variety of bait and calls, Leonard traverses one of four large, open hunting areas searching for wild animals to shoot, including deer, wild boars, turkeys, and ducks. There are also two target ranges where the player can practice firing their weapons at both mobile and stationary targets.

Reception

The game received unfavorable to overwhelmingly negative reviews.

References

External links
 

1998 video games
DOS games
Gray Matter Studios games
Hunting video games
Interplay Entertainment games
MacOS games
Video game sequels
Video games developed in the United States
Windows games
Sprite-based first-person shooters